Cesare Dujany or César Dujany (20 February 1920 in Saint-Vincent (Aosta Valley) – 31 March 2019 in Châtillon) was an Italian politician.

References

1920 births
2019 deaths
Presidents of Aosta Valley